Eduardo Faleiro (born 30 August 1940) is an Indian politician, and former federal minister from Goa. In September 2006, he was the commissioner for non-resident Indian affairs for the Congress Government of Goa.

Biography

Faleiro was born on 30 August 1940.  He was a Union Cabinet minister at the Indian federal government in New Delhi from 1986 to 1996. Earlier, he was a member of the legislative assembly of Goa for a short while, before shifting to national-level politics. When the Indian National Congress, a party he has associated with for most of his political career, was out of power, Faleiro was a member of the Rajya Sabha too, the upper house of the Indian parliament.

Below is a list of posts held by him:
 1971-1976:  Member, Goa Legislative Assembly
 1974-1976:  Deputy Leader, CLP (I), Goa Legislative Assembly
 1977:  Elected to the Sixth Lok Sabha
 1980:  Re-elected to the Seventh Lok Sabha
 1982-1986:  Chairman, Economic Development Corporation
 1984:  Elected to the Eighth Lok Sabha for the third consecutive time
 1985-1986:  Chairman, House Committee
 May 1986 to February 1988:  Union Minister of State, External Affairs February 1988 to December 1989:  Union Minister of State, Economic Affairs (Finance)
 1989-1990:  Elected to the Ninth Lok Sabha for the fourth time
 1990:  Member, Committee of Privileges; Member, Consultative Committee; Ministry of Planning and Program Implementation
 1991:  Elected to the Tenth Lok Sabha for the fifth time
 1992:  Leader of the Indian Delegation to the United Nations
 23 June 1991 to January 1993:  Union Minister of State, External Affairs
 18 January 1993 to April 1996 – Union Minister of State, Chemicals & Fertilizers, Ocean Development, Electronics, Parliamentary Affairs
 1995:  Vice Chairperson of Independent World Commission on Oceans
 26 July 1999:  Elected Member of Rajya Sabha (Council of States)

In March 2006, Mr Faleiro was appointed commissioner for Non-resident Indian Affairs by the Government of Goa, with the rank of a cabinet minister.

2007: Chairman of Universal Peace Federation of India (non-governmental organization in consultative status in the Social and Economic Council of the United Nations)

Honours
Faleiro was honoured by the Prime Minister of Portugal António Costa with the 'Grande Oficial da Ordem do Infante da Henrique' in January 2017.

References

External links
 Eduardo Faleiro, official page
 Links via Google.com
 Once I went to inaugurate a road... (Eduardo Faleiro)
 Konkani Controversy - note by Eduardo Faleiro, former Union Minister
 	 US position on Iraq is total 'dadagiri'
 Goanet Reader: Wanted: an Asian perspective on the freedom ofreligion (Eduardo Faleiro)
 Education for All (Eduardo Faleiro, MP)

1940 births
Living people
People from South Goa district
Indian Roman Catholics
India MPs 1977–1979
India MPs 1980–1984
India MPs 1984–1989
India MPs 1989–1991
India MPs 1991–1996
Lok Sabha members from Goa
Rajya Sabha members from Goa
Indian National Congress politicians from Goa
Portuguese people of Goan descent
Indian National Congress (U) politicians